Mandy Marquardt (born ) is an American female Sprint track cyclist, representing the United States and Team Novo Nordisk, the world's first-all diabetes professional cycling team. Marquardt was diagnosed with type 1 diabetes at the age of 16. Marquardt is an 25-time U.S National Champion, 3-time U.S National Record Holder in the 500m, 1 km and Team Sprint.

She recently defended her titles in the Time Trial, Sprint and Team Sprint at the 2022 United States National Track Championships. Marquardt has won the gold in the 500m Time Trial for the last six years, starting in 2016. (The 2020 U.S. Track Nationals were canceled due to the pandemic.)

Marquardt was named to the 2020 Olympic Long Team for track cycling by USA Cycling.

Marquardt is married to seven-time National Champion Jamie Alvord. The pair met in 2010 when they both raced at the velodrome near Trexlertown, Pennsylvania. Marquardt and Alvord represented the United States at the Pan American Track Cycling Championships in Lima, Peru.

Early life 
Born in Mannheim, Germany, in August 1991, Mandy Marquardt moved with her mother and father to Plantation, Florida, when she was six years old. After playing tennis, swimming and showing an interest in triathlons, she began cycling on the track at the age of 10 at the Velodrome at the Brian Piccolo Park. A year later, she won her first two gold medals at the 2003 U.S. Junior Women’s 10-12 Road National Championships in Texas.

Marquardt continued to race both the road and track discipline for years.  At the age of 15, she moved to Germany to live with her father and to race on the European circuit. One year later, she won a bronze medal in the 500m time trial at the German Junior National Championships.

At the end of year testing in Germany, Marquardt was diagnosed with type 1 diabetes at the age of 16. A doctor told her that she would never be able to compete at a high level at her sport again.  After working with and learning from experts to manage her diabetes, she once again won the bronze medal in the 500m Time Trial at the German Junior National Championships.

After moving back to Florida, Marquardt  joined Team Novo Nordisk in 2010. That same year, she enrolled at Penn State Lehigh Valley, where she eventually became a Campus Cycling Club coach and graduated with a degree in Business Management and Marketing.

Major results

Sources:

2014
2nd Sprint, Champions of Sprint
3rd Keirin, Keirin Revenge
3rd Team Sprint, Grand Prix of Colorado Spring
2015
1st Keirin, Keirin Revenge
2nd Sprint, Champions of Sprint
2016
Puerto Rico Track Cup 
1st Sprint 
1st Keirin 
1st 500m Time Trial
3rd Scratch Race
Easter International Grand Prix
1st Sprint 
2nd Keirin 
2nd Keirin, Fastest Man on Wheels
2nd Sprint, US Sprint GP
3rd  Team Sprint, 2016 Pan American Track Cycling Championships (with Madalyn Godby)
Festival of Speed 
3rd Keirin
3rd Sprint
2017
1st Sprint, Easter International Grand Prix 
1st Sprint, US Sprint GP
1st Team Sprint, Fastest Man on Wheels (with Madalyn Godby)
1st Sprint, Keirin Cup / Madison Cup
2018
1st  500m Time Trial, United States National Track Championships
1st Sprint, U.S. Sprint Gran Prix
2019
1st  Sprint, United States National Track Championships
1st  Keirin, United States National Track Championships
1st  500m Time Trial, United States National Track Championships
1st Sprint, UCI C1 Fastest Woman on Wheels
3rd  Sprint, 2019 Pan American Track Cycling Championships
4th Sprint, 2019–20 UCI Track Cycling World Cup, Round 1 in Minsk, Belarus
2021
1st  Sprint, United States National Track Championships
1st  Keirin, United States National Track Championships
1st  500m Time Trial, United States National Track Championships
1st  Team Sprint, United States National Track Championships with McKenna McKee and Allyson Wasielewski
1st Sprint, UCI Fastest Man and Woman On Wheels, CL1 
1st Keirin, UCI Fastest Man and Woman On Wheels, CL1 
1st Sprint, UCI Festival of Speed, CL1 
1st Keirin, UCI Festival of Speed, CL1 
1st Sprint, UCI Tandemonium, CL1 
1st Keirin, UCI Tandemonium, CL1 
2022
1st  Sprint, United States National Track Championships
1st  500m Time Trial, United States National Track Championships
1st  Team Sprint, United States National Track Championships with Annika Flannigan and Divya Verma
2nd   Keirin, United States National Track Championships
2nd Sprint, UCI CL1 - T-Town Summer Games - US GP
2nd Sprint, UCI CL1 - T-Town Summer Games - Discover Lehigh Valley GP
2nd Sprint, UCI CL2  - T-Town Summer Games  - Festival Of Speed
3rd Keirin, UCI CL2  T-Town Summer Games  - Festival Of Speed
4th Keirin, UCI CL1 - T-Town Summer Games - US GP
4th Keirin, UCI CL1 - T-Town Summer Games - Discover Lehigh Valley GP
4th Team Sprint, Pan American Track Cycling Championships new national record with Kayla Hankins, Keely Kortman, and McKenna McKee
4th Time Trial, Pan American Track Cycling Championships

References

External links

1991 births
Living people
American female cyclists
American track cyclists
21st-century American women
People with type 1 diabetes